Gwon Jung-hyeon (권중현, 權重鉉; born 29 July 1942) is a former South Korean cyclist. He competed in three events at the 1968 Summer Olympics.

References

External links
 

1942 births
Living people
South Korean male cyclists
Olympic cyclists of South Korea
Cyclists at the 1968 Summer Olympics
Asian Games medalists in cycling
Cyclists at the 1966 Asian Games
Cyclists at the 1970 Asian Games
Medalists at the 1966 Asian Games
Medalists at the 1970 Asian Games
Asian Games silver medalists for South Korea
Asian Games bronze medalists for South Korea
20th-century South Korean people
21st-century South Korean people